This is a list of women who have been elected as member of the Seventh Parliament of the Fourth Republic of Ghana.

Lists

See also 

 List of female members of the Eighth Parliament of the Fourth Republic of Ghana

References 

Female
Ghana